The Incredible Hulk is an ongoing comic book series featuring the Marvel Comics superhero the Hulk and his alter ego Dr. Bruce Banner. First published in May 1962, the series ran for six issues before it was cancelled in March 1963, and the Hulk character began appearing in Tales to Astonish. With issue #102, Tales to Astonish was renamed to The Incredible Hulk in April 1968, becoming its second volume. The series continued to run until issue #474 in March 1999 when it was replaced with the series Hulk which ran until February 2000 and was retitled to The Incredible Hulks third volume, running until March 2007 when it became The Incredible Hercules with a new title character. The Incredible Hulk returned in September 2009 beginning at issue #600, which became The Incredible Hulks in November 2010 and focused on the Hulk and the modern incarnation of his expanded family. The series returned to The Incredible Hulk in December 2011 and ran until January 2013, when it was replaced with The Indestructible Hulk as part of Marvel's Marvel NOW! relaunch.

Publication history

The original series was cancelled with issue #6 (March 1963). Lee had written each story, with Jack Kirby penciling the first five issues and Steve Ditko penciling and inking the sixth.

Tales to Astonish

A year and a half after the series was cancelled, the Hulk became one of two features in Tales to Astonish, beginning in issue #60 (Oct. 1964).

This new Hulk feature was initially scripted by writer-editor Lee and illustrated by the team of penciller Steve Ditko and inker George Roussos. Other artists later in this run included Jack Kirby from #68–87 (June 1965 – Oct. 1966), doing full pencils or, more often, layouts for other artists; Gil Kane, credited as "Scott Edwards", in #76 (February 1966), his first Marvel Comics work; Bill Everett inking Kirby in #78–84 (Feb–Oct. 1966); and John Buscema penciling Kirby's layouts in #85–87. The Tales to Astonish run introduced the supervillains the Leader, who would become the Hulk's nemesis, and the Abomination, another gamma-irradiated being. Comics artist Marie Severin finished out the Hulk's run in Tales to Astonish.

Beginning with issue #102 (April 1968) the book was retitled The Incredible Hulk (vol. 2) and ran until 1999, when Marvel cancelled the series and restarted the title with the shorter-titled Hulk #1.

1970s
The Incredible Hulk (vol. 2) was published through the 1970s. At times, the writers included Archie Goodwin, Chris Claremont, and Tony Isabella. Len Wein wrote the series from 1974 through 1978. Nearly all of the 1970s issues were drawn by either Herb Trimpe, who was the regular artist for seven years, or Sal Buscema, who was the regular artist for 10 years, starting with issue #194 (December 1975). Issues #180–181 (Oct.–Nov. 1974) introduced the character Wolverine, who would go on to become one of Marvel Comics' most popular. The original art for the comic book page that introduced Wolverine sold for $657,250 in May 2014. Key supporting characters included Jim Wilson and Jarella, both of whom would make few appearances outside of this decade.

In 1977, Marvel launched a second title, The Rampaging Hulk, a black-and-white comics magazine. This was originally conceived as a flashback series, set between the end of his original, short-lived solo title and the beginning of his feature in Tales to Astonish. After nine issues, the magazine was retitled The Hulk! and printed in color. A nine-part "continuity insert" that in many ways contradicted the original comics stories was retconned later as a movie made by an alien movie producer, Bereet who also portrayed her people as warmongering shapeshifters.

1980s and 1990s
Following Roger Stern, Bill Mantlo took over the writing with issue #245 (March 1980). Among the adversaries Mantlo created for the series were the U-Foes and the Soviet Super-Soldiers. Mantlo's "Crossroads of Eternity" stories, which ran through issues #300–313 (Oct. 1984 – Nov.1985), explored the idea that Banner had suffered child abuse. Later, The Incredible Hulk writers Peter David and Greg Pak called these stories an influence on their approaches to the series. After five years, Mantlo left the title to write Alpha Flight, while Alpha Flight writer John Byrne took over the series and left it after six issues, claiming, "I took on the Hulk after a discussion with editor-in-chief Jim Shooter, in which I mentioned some of the things I would like to do with that character, given the chance. He told me to do whatever was necessary to get on the book, he liked my ideas so much. I did, and once installed he immediately changed his mind—'You can't do this!' Six issues was as much as I could take." Byrne's final issue featured the wedding of Bruce Banner and Betty Ross. Byrne had done a seventh issue, consisting entirely of one-panel pages. It was eventually published in Marvel Fanfare #29.

Al Milgrom briefly succeeded Byrne before new regular writer Peter David took over with issue #331 (May 1987), the start of an 11-year tenure. He returned to the Stern and Mantlo abuse storyline, expanding the damage caused, and depicting Banner as suffering dissociative identity disorder. In issue #377 he merged Banner, the green Hulk, and the grey Hulk into a single being with the unified personality, intelligence, and powers of all three. David claimed he had been planning this from the beginning of his tenure on the series, and had held off so that he could make the readers have an emotional attachment to the grey Hulk. David worked with numerous artists over his run on the series, including Dale Keown, Todd McFarlane, Sam Kieth, Gary Frank, Liam Sharp, Terry Dodson, Mike Deodato, George Pérez, and Adam Kubert.

In 1998, David followed editor Bobbie Chase's suggestion to kill Betty Ross. In the introduction to the Hulk trade paperback Beauty and the Behemoth, David said that his wife had recently left him, providing inspiration for the storyline. Marvel executives used Ross' death as an opportunity to push the idea of bringing back the Savage Hulk. David disagreed, leading to his parting ways with Marvel. His last issue of The Incredible Hulk was (vol. 2) #467 (Aug. 1998), his 137th. Also in 1998, Marvel relaunched The Rampaging Hulk as a standard comic book rather than as a comics magazine.

Relaunches
Following David's departure, Joe Casey took over as writer until this series ended with The Incredible Hulk (vol. 2) #474 (March 1999). The first volume of the shorter-titled Hulk began immediately the following month, scripted by Byrne and penciled by Ron Garney.

Erik Larsen and Jerry Ordway briefly took over scripting and with issue #12 (March 2000) the series was restarted as The Incredible Hulk vol. 3 New series writer Paul Jenkins developed the Hulk's multiple personalities, and his run was followed by Bruce Jones. Jones' storyline featuring Banner being pursued by a secret conspiracy and aided by the mysterious Mr. Blue. Jones appended his 43-issues of Incredible Hulk with the limited series Hulk/Thing: Hard Knocks #1–4 (Nov. 2004 – Feb. 2005), which Marvel published after putting the ongoing series on hiatus.

Peter David, who had initially signed a contract for the six-issue Tempest Fugit limited series, returned as writer when it was decided to make that story the first five parts of the revived volume three. After a four-part tie-in to the House of M crossover and a one-issue epilogue, David left the series once more, citing the need to do non-Hulk work for the sake of his career.

In 2006, writer Greg Pak took over the series, With issue #113 (Feb. 2008), it was retitled The Incredible Hercules, still written by Pak but starring the mythological demigod Hercules and teenage genius Amadeus Cho. Concurrently, Marvel launched Hulk (vol. 2), written by Jeph Loeb and drawn by Ed McGuinness. While continuing to publish Hulk (vol. 2), Marvel also relaunched the second 1960s Hulk series with The Incredible Hulk (vol. 2) #600 (Sept. 2009). With the arrival of the Red Hulk—a transformed General "Thunderbolt" Ross, the Hulk's longtime nemesis—and the Red She-Hulk—the revived Betty Ross—this series was retitled Incredible Hulks with issue #612 (Nov. 2010). This lasted through issue #635 (Oct. 2011). Yet another Hulk series, The Incredible Hulk vol. 4, written by Jason Aaron and drawn by Marc Silvestri, began with a new #1 and lasted 15 issues (Dec. 2011 – Dec. 2012). In November 2012, Marvel announced it would publish a new Hulk title, Indestructible Hulk, by writer Mark Waid and artist Leinil Yu. Hulk (vol. 2) became Red She-Hulk with issue #58 (Dec. 2012).

In 2017, The Incredible Hulk was relaunched with issue #709 with the series using "legacy numbering". However, the main character was Amadeus Cho instead of Bruce Banner, since Cho succeeded Banner as the Hulk as shown in the Totally Awesome Hulk series. After being killed, Marvel resurrected Bruce Banner and restored him to the ongoing series in 2018, changing the title to The Immortal Hulk and focusing on more horror-inspired tales. Al Ewing's acclaimed run delves deeply into Peter David's dissociative identity disorder premise with an enhanced supernatural aspect. Bruce Banner can be killed during the day, but the Immortal Hulk will resurrect at night and take vengeance.

Accolades

References

External links
 The Incredible Hulk, The Incredible Hulk vol. 2, The Incredible Hulk vol. 3, and The Incredible Hulk vol. 4 at the Grand Comics Database

1962 comics debuts
1963 comics endings
1968 comics debuts
1999 comics endings
2000 comics debuts
2008 comics endings
2009 comics debuts
2010 comics endings
2011 comics debuts
2012 comics endings
2018 comics debuts
Comics by Archie Goodwin (comics)
Comics by Gerry Conway
Comics by Greg Pak
Comics by Jack Kirby
Comics by John Byrne (comics)
Comics by Len Wein
Comics by Peter David
Comics by Roger Stern
Comics by Roy Thomas
Comics by Stan Lee
Comics by Steve Englehart
Marvel Comics titles
Superhero comics